Matthew Clarmont (born Mathieu Clarmont;  – 7 May 1772) was an English banker who served as Governor of the Bank of England from 1766–69. He had been Deputy Governor from 1764–66. He replaced John Weyland as Governor and was succeeded by William Cooper. Clarmont's tenure as Governor occurred during the end of the Bengal bubble (1757–1769).

He was born in Bordeaux, the son of Mathieu and Jeanne Clarmont, and naturalised in 1724 by an Act of Parliament (No. 5, 11 George I). In 1766, he was also director of the French Protestant Hospital in London.

In 1733, Clarmont married Martha (Marthe) Leglize, daughter and co-heir of Gideon Leglize (Gédéon l'Église). They had one daughter Susanne, born in 1736, and one son, Jean, born in May 1737, who died along with Martha in June 1737. He lived at 16, Mincing Lane, London. He died in Bath, Somerset, aged 68.

See also
Chief Cashier of the Bank of England

References 

1700s births
Date of birth unknown
1772 deaths
British bankers
Deputy Governors of the Bank of England
Governors of the Bank of England
French emigrants to England
Businesspeople from Bordeaux